The list of Mister Thailand to represent to Mister World, Mister International, Manhunt International, Mister Supranational, Mister Global, Man of the World, Mister Model International, Mister Universe Model, Mister Tourism World, Mister Universal Ambassador, Best Model of the World

Grand Slam Pageants 
Color keys

Mister World

Manhunt International

Mister International

Mister Global

Mister Supranational

Man of the World

Minor International Pageants 
Color keys

Mister Model International

Mister National Universe

Mister Tourism World

Mister United Continents

Mister Grand International

Man of the Year

Mister Universe Tourism

Mister Model of the World

Mister Universal Ambassador

Best Model of the World

Altitude World Supermodel

Mister United World

Mister Tourism and Culture Universe 
:Miss & Mister Tourism and Culture Universe

Man of the Universe

Mister Model Worldwide

Mister Continental International

Men International

Mister Tourism Globe

Mister Working Men International

Global Asian Model

World Fitness Supermodel

Mister Landscapes International

Ambassador of the World

Mister Globe

Alpha Man International

New Silk Road 
:New Silk Road Model search

Man Of The Globe International

Mister Tourism Worldwide

Mister Asia

Mister RunWay Model Universe 
:Mister & Miss Runway Model Universe

Mister Grand Universe

Mister Runway Model International

Mister Model of the Universe

Man Of The Earth

Mister Friendship International

Mister Glam International

Mister Planet

Mister Ocean

Mister Tourism Ambassador Universe 
:Mister & Miss Tourism Ambassador Universe

World Beauty Fashion & Fitness

Mister Asian International 
:Mister & Miss Asian International / Mister Asian International & Mister SE Asia International / Mister Asian International & Elite Mister Asian International

Starzhunk International

Mister Eco International

Top International Model of the world

Mister Amity International

Mister Continental Tourism

Mister Southeast Asial

Men Universe Model

Teen 
Color keys

Mister Global Teen

Prince International 
:Prince & Princess International

Mister Teen International 
:Mister Miss Teen International / Pre-Teen & International Teen of the Year / Asia Pacific Prince & Princess

Little Mister United World 
:Little Miss and Little Mister United World

Little Mister Universe 
:Little Miss & Mister Universe

Best Prince Of The World 
:Best Princess & Prince Of The World

Top Child Model of the Planet 
:Top Child and Teen Model of the Planet

LBMA Star Kids Model

Future Fashion Faces World Kid's

Student of China

Mister Pacific World 
:Miss & Mister Pacific World

Junior Idol World

Prince World 
:Prince & Princess World

Mister Teen Universal 
:Universal Teen & Kids Pageant

Other Gender 
Color keys

Mister Gay World

For Hearing impaired 
Color keys

Mister Deaf World 
:Miss & Mister Deaf World

Mister Deaf International 
:Miss & Mister Deaf International

Mister Deaf Universum 
:Miss & Mister Deaf Universum

Mister Deaf Stars 
:Miss & Mister Deaf Stars

Mister Deaf Fashion 
:Miss & Mister Deaf Fashion - International Deaf Fashion Week

Mister Deaf Galaxy 
:Miss Mister Mrs Deaf Galaxy

Former pageants 
Color keys

Mister Culture World 
:Mister and Miss Culture World

Mr. Asia Contest

Grasim Mr. International

See also

References

External links
 , Mr World on Facebook, Mr World on Instagram, Mr World on Twitter, Mr World on YouTube
, Manhunt International on Facebook, Manhunt International on Instagram, Manhunt International on Twitter, Manhunt International on YouTube
, Mister International on Facebook, Mister International on Instagram, Mister International on Twitter, Mister International on YouTube
, Mister Global on Facebook, Mister Global on Instagram, Mister Global on Twitter, Mister Global on YouTube
, Mister Supranational on Facebook, Mister Supranational on Instagram, Mister Supranational on YouTube
, Mister Universal Ambassador on Facebook, Mister Universal Ambassador on Instagram, Mister Universal Ambassador on YouTube
, Mister Model International on Facebook, Mister Model International on Instagram, Mister Model International on Twitter, Mister Model International on YouTube
, Best Model of the World on Facebook, Best Model of the World on Instagram
, Mister National Universe on Facebook, Mister National Universe on Instagram, Mister National Universe on YouTube

Mister Thailand
Beauty pageants in Thailand
Male beauty pageants
Man of the World (pageant)
Mister Global by country
Mister Global Organization